Hugh Bolton was an 18th-century Anglican priest in Ireland.

Harman was educated at Trinity College, Dublin.  He was Dean of Waterford from 1723  until his death in December 1758.

References

Alumni of Trinity College Dublin
Deans of Waterford
People from County Waterford
1683 births
1758 deaths
18th-century Irish Anglican priests